Mark Anderson (born 29 June 1962) is a South African retired football (soccer) goalkeeper who played professionally for Pretoria Callies, Mamelodi Sundowns, Umtata Bush Bucks, Santos Cape Town and Hellenic FC.

References

1962 births
Living people
Association football goalkeepers
South African soccer players
Mamelodi Sundowns F.C. players
Bush Bucks F.C. players
Santos F.C. (South Africa) players
Hellenic F.C. players
White South African people
South Africa international soccer players
Pretoria Callies F.C. players